Ostrowsko  is a village in the administrative district of Gmina Uniejów, within Poddębice County, Łódź Voivodeship, in central Poland.

The village has a population of 400.

References

Villages in Poddębice County